Steve Paproski  (23 September 1928 – 3 December 1993) was a Canadian politician and professional football player. He played in the Canadian Football League (CFL) from 1949 to 1954 and served as a federal Member of Parliament from 1968 to 1993.

Early life
Born in Lwów, Poland, he came to Edmonton, Alberta as a child. He attended the University of Arizona on a sports scholarship.

Pro football career
He was a lineman for the Edmonton Eskimos of the Canadian Football League from 1949 to 1954. In this role he became part of the Edmonton Eskimo alumni which would come to dominate Alberta political life in future decades. Among other Eskimoes from this era who achieved prominence in politics are Alberta premiers Peter Lougheed and Don Getty, plus lieutenant governor the honourable Norman Kwong.

Political career
In 1968, he was elected to the House of Commons of Canada for the riding of Edmonton Centre. A Progressive Conservative, he was re-elected in 1972, and 1974. He was elected in 1979, 1980, 1984, and 1988 for Edmonton North. From 1976 to 1978, he was the Chief Opposition Whip. During Joe Clark's brief term as Prime Minister from 1979 to 1980, he was the Minister of State for Fitness and Amateur Sport and Minister of State for Multiculturalism. During Brian Mulroney's terms as Prime Minister from 1984 to 1993, he was the Deputy Chair of Committees of the Whole. While in opposition, Steve served leader Robert Stanfield as deputy whip and later chief whip for the Progressive Conservative caucus.

Paproski was an ethnic Ukrainian and a Roman Catholic. 
His brothers Kenneth Paproski and Carl Paproski also served as members of the Legislative Assembly of Alberta.

References

External links
 

1928 births
1993 deaths
Sportspeople from Lviv
People from Lwów Voivodeship
Edmonton Elks players
Players of Canadian football from Alberta
Ukrainian players of Canadian football
Members of the 21st Canadian Ministry
Members of the House of Commons of Canada from Alberta
Members of the King's Privy Council for Canada
Progressive Conservative Party of Canada MPs
Canadian football people from Edmonton
Politicians from Edmonton
Ukrainian Roman Catholics
Ukrainian emigrants to Canada
Canadian sportsperson-politicians
Canadian Roman Catholics